Space Ghost is an American Saturday morning superhero animated television series produced by Hanna-Barbera Productions. It first aired on CBS from September 10, 1966, to September 16, 1967, and continued reruns until September 7, 1968. The series was composed of two unrelated segments, Space Ghost and Dino Boy in the Lost Valley. The series was created by Alex Toth and produced and directed by William Hanna and Joseph Barbera. Sometimes, it is alternatively called Space Ghost & Dino Boy to acknowledge the presence of both shows.

The Space Ghost segments were seen again in the 1976 series Space Ghost and Frankenstein Jr. (which replaced the Dino Boy segments with the Frankenstein Jr. ones from fellow Hanna-Barbera show Frankenstein Jr. and The Impossibles), which aired on NBC from November 27, 1976, to September 4, 1977, after NBC put The Kids From C.A.P.E.R. on hiatus.

Space Ghost 
Space Ghost, along with teenaged sidekicks Jan and Jace and their pet monkey Blip, fight villains in outer space. Usually, Space Ghost's sidekicks would get captured or trapped by the villains, and Space Ghost would have to defeat the villains and save the day. His enemies included Zorak, Brak and his brother Sisto, the Creature King, the Black Widow (a.k.a. the Spider Woman), Lokar, Moltar, and Metallus.

Voice cast 
 Gary Owens as Space Ghost
 Ginny Tyler as Jan, the Black Widow a.k.a. the Spider Woman
 Tim Matheson as Jace
 Don Messick as Blip, Zorak, Sisto, Sandman, One Eye, Zorket, the Schemer, the Evil Collector, the Creature King (1967)
 Lucille Bliss as Wootan, Wootan's mother
 Ted Cassidy as Metallus, Tansut, Tarko the Terrible
 Regis Cordic as Moltar
 Paul Frees as Brago, Zeron, Cyclo
 Keye Luke as Brak, Lokar
 Vic Perrin as The Creature King (1966; Creature King, The Space Ark), the Lurker, Pirahnor
 Alan Reed as Glasstor, The Sorcerer
 Paul Stewart as Dr. Nightmare, The Mind Taker
 Paul Winchell as Owlie

Dino Boy in the Lost Valley 
Dino Boy is a young boy called Todd who parachuted out of a crashing plane with his parents still on board.

He lands in an unknown South American valley where dinosaurs, prehistoric mammals, and cavemen have somehow survived extinction and now live alongside some strange creatures and various tribes like the Moss Men, the Rock Pygmies, the Worm People and the Vampire Men, amongst others.

Dino Boy then meets the caveman Ugh (who saves Dino Boy from a Smilodon when he first arrives) and his pet baby Brontosaurus Bronty who become his friends in the episodes to come. The cartoon also features a woolly mammoth named Tusko who Ugh would enlist in certain episodes to help him, Dino Boy, and Bronty out.

Voice cast 
 Johnny Carson (who soon switched to his full name, John David Carson, to avoid confusion with the talk show host) as Todd/Dino Boy
 Mike Road as Ugh
 Don Messick as Bronty
 Gary Owens as opening narration

Episodes 
With the exception of the final two half-hour shows (the "Council of Doom" episodes), each episode featured two Space Ghost segments with one Dino Boy segment between them.

The final two half-hour shows only feature Space Ghost. Additionally, they feature cameos from other characters (the Herculoids, Moby Dick, the Mighty Mightor, and Shazzan) that would appear in their own Hanna-Barbera series broadcasts on CBS the following (1967–68) season.

Home media 
Space Ghost & Dino Boy were released on multiple VHS tapes in the 1980s put out by Worldvision Home Video and later re-released by GoodTimes Home Video under the Kids Klassics label. The episodes on the VHS tape for Space Ghost were "The Heat Thing", "Zorak", "The Creature King" and the Dino Boy episode "The Worm People". Worldvision released another VHS tape, Space Ghost and Dino Boy: Ghostly Tales; this contained the episodes "The Robot Master", The Energy Monster", "Hi-Jackers", "The Lure", and "The Schemer". The Dino Boy episodes were "Marooned" and "The Red Ants". These same episodes were released in the UK by The Video Collection.

Warner Home Video (via Hanna-Barbera Cartoons and Warner Bros. Family Entertainment) released Space Ghost & Dino Boy: The Complete Series on DVD in Region 1 on July 17, 2007.

The DVD edition presents the episodes on two double-sided DVDs, but alters the order from the original air-date order. This episode order is also present on Blu-ray and digital sell-throughs.

Disc 1
 Side A
 1 - The Heat Thing / The Worm People / Zorak
 2 - Creature King / The Treemen / The Lizard Slavers
 3 - The Web / The Sacrifice / Homing Device
 4 - The Drone / The Moss Men / The Sandman
 Side B
 5 - The Robot Master / Marooned / The Energy Monster
 6 - Hi-Jackers / Giant Ants / The Lure
 7 - The Schemer / The Rock Pygmies / The Evil Collector
 8 - Lokar - King of the Killer Locusts / Danger River / Brago
 9 - The Cyclopeds / The Fire God / Space Sargasso
 10 - The Iceman / The Vampire Men / The Time Machine
 11 - The Space Birds / The Wolf People / Attack of the Saucer Crab
 12 - Nightmare Planet / Valley of the Giants / Space Armada

Disc 2
 Side A
 13 - Ruler of the Rock Robots / The Bird Riders / The Challenge
 14 - Jungle Planet / The Marksman / Revenge of the Spider Woman
 15 - The Space Ark / The Terrible Chase / Glasstor
 16 - The Space Piranhas / The Spear Warriors / The Sorcerer
 17 - The Ovens of Moltar / The Ant Warriors / Transor - the Matter Mover
 18 - The Looters / The Mighty Snow Creature / The Gargoyloids
 The final two episodes are a six-part Space Ghost story called "The Council of Doom"
 19 - The Meeting / Clutches of the Creature King / The Deadly Trap
 20 - The Molten Monsters of Moltar / Two Faces of Doom / The Final Encounter
 Side B
 Feature-Length Profile Simplicity: The Life and Art of Alex Toth

A Blu-ray set of the series was released by Warner Bros. Home Entertainment (under the Warner Archive Collection label), on October 13, 2020. The release is a two-disc set containing all 20 episodes.

Comics 
The TV series was adapted into a comic strip by Dan Spiegle, distributed by Gold Key Comics. He has also appeared in comics published by Marvel Comics, Comico and Archie Comics.

Manga 
A manga adaptation by Kentaro Nakajo was serialized in Weekly Shonen Sunday by Shogakukan in 1967. The manga was compiled into one volume.

Space Ghost Coast to Coast

In 1994, nearly three decades after the finale of the original series, Mike Lazzo pitched the idea of an adult animated parody talk show using the Space Ghost character to Cartoon Network. Voice actors George Lowe, C. Martin Croker, and Andy Merrill joined the project, which Cartoon Network would soon air as Space Ghost Coast to Coast. The series premiered on April 15, 1994, and originally ended on December 17, 1999. The series was revived on May 7, 2001, and was moved to the new Adult Swim late-night programming block on September 2 of that year, where new episodes premiered until April 12, 2004. Two final seasons were released on GameTap from 2006 to 2008. Over 11 seasons, 108 episodes aired. The show gained spin-offs in the form of The Brak Show (2000–2007) and Aqua Teen Hunger Force (2000–2015), and has been cited as inspiration for a variety of Adult Swim programming in the years since its debut. In a 2014 interview, Eric Andre spoke about the show's influence on The Eric Andre Show, saying, "Before we started shooting, I rented as many seasons I could get my hands on and did a Space Ghost marathon by myself in my house, just so I could absorb as much Space Ghost as I could."

Later DC Comics era 
In 2016, Space Ghost and his allies and Dino Boy played a major role in the DC Comics series Future Quest, that also featured characters from various animated series produced by Hanna-Barbera such as Jonny Quest, The Herculoids, Birdman and the Galaxy Trio, Frankenstein Jr. and The Impossibles and Moby Dick and Mighty Mightor.

See also 

 List of works produced by Hanna-Barbera Productions
 List of Hanna-Barbera characters

References

External links 
 

1966 American television series debuts
1968 American television series endings
1960s American animated television series
1960s American science fiction television series
English-language television shows
Television series by Hanna-Barbera
CBS original programming
Space Ghost television series
Animated television series about extraterrestrial life
American children's animated action television series
American children's animated space adventure television series
American children's animated science fantasy television series
American children's animated superhero television series
Hanna-Barbera superheroes
DC Comics superheroes
Television shows adapted into comics
Television series set in outer space
Animated television series about dinosaurs
Prehistoric people in popular culture
Fiction about neanderthals